Ja'far ibn Muhammad ibn Ammar al-Burjumi (died 866) was a chief judge (qadi al-qudat) of the Abbasid Caliphate.

Described as a member of a family originally from Kufa, he served as judge of Wasit before being appointed to the Kufan judiciary in 849/50 as replacement to the Mihna-era qadi Ghassan ibn Muhammad al-Marwazi. In 863 or 864 he was elevated to the chief judgeship by the caliph al-Musta'in, and he held that position until his death in 866.

See also
 Ja'far ibn Abd al-Wahid ibn Ja'far al-Hashimi
 Yahya ibn Aktham
 Ibn Qutaybah

Notes

References
 
 
 
 
 

Chief qadis of the Abbasid Caliphate
866 deaths
9th-century people from the Abbasid Caliphate
People from Kufa